Stefan Forrest, also known as Don Stefano (born 10 June 1989), is a Danish-born producer, singer and songwriter, who currently lives and works in Los Angeles, USA, signed with Warner Chappell Music.

Career 
Stefan Forrest is best known for his production and song writing contributions to the Danish Band, Lukas Graham, Oliver Kesi ("Dumme Penge", Søvnløs") & Patrick Dorgan. Forrest is also noted for singing the hook on Kesi's "Dumme Penge" as well the multi-platinum selling hit, "Søvnløs".

As one-half of the production duo, Future Animals, Forrest's first notoriety came about through his songwriting and production for Lukas Graham. Lukas Graham's debut release album, the self-titled  Lukas Graham topped the Danish charts for 15 weeks, and as of December 2015 has remained in the Danish Top 40 for 100+ weeks. Lukas Graham's sophomore release, the self-titled international album Lukas Graham (2015) alternatively known as the Blue Album, was released in Denmark on 16 June 2015 debuting at No. 1 for 15 consecutive weeks and has since yielded four Number 1 singles, including "7 Years".

The Future Animals finalized Lukas Graham's 2016 U.S. debut album, which was released on 1 April 2016. "7 Years" has topped iTunes USA Top 100 most downloaded singles and currently has found its way to three consecutive weeks at No. 2 on Billboard's Hot 100 singles. He has also produced songs for singers Selena Gomez, Julia Michaels and Hailee Steinfeld. In 2019 he released the album Last Summer through his Future Animals outfit.
Forrest is also the founder of the Rocket Science record company, through which he has released original music.

Personal life 

Stefan is also co-owner of Sliders restaurant located in the Copenhagen districts of Nørrebro and Vesterbro.

Discography

Awards and nominations

Certifications 
Studio albums

Singles

Notes

References 

Danish restaurateurs
1989 births
Living people